Yasar may refer to:

People
 Yaşar (name), a Turkish name, including a list of people with the name
 Mehmet Yasar, 19th century Macedonian politician
 Nedim Yasar (1987–2018), Danish former gangster and radio host of Turkish origin
 Yasar Shah, Indian politician and a member the Legislative Assembly of Uttar Pradesh
 Yasar Onel, Turkish-born Swiss and American physicist

Places
 Yasar, Iran, a village in Khuzestan Province, Iran

See also

Yaşar (disambiguation)
Qarah Yasar (disambiguation)